Reins are items of horse tack, used to direct a horse or other animal used for riding.  They are long straps that can be made of leather, nylon, metal, or other materials, and attach to a bridle via either its bit or its noseband.

Use for riding

Reins are used to give subtle commands or cues, also known as rein aids.  Various commands may signal a turn, ask for a slower speed, request a halt or rein back.  Rein aids are used along with leg aids, shifting of body weight, and sometimes voice commands.

Harness reins
On some types of harnesses there might be supporting rings or "terrets" used to carry the reins over the animal's back. When pairs of equines are used in drawing a wagon or coach it is usual for the outer side of each pair to be connected to the reins and for the inside of the bits to be connected between the pair of horses by a short bridging strap or rope. The driver carries "four-in-hand" or "six-in-hand" being the number of reins connecting to the pairs.

Other uses
A single rein or rope may be attached to a halter to lead or guide a horse or packhorse. A long rein called a longe line may be used to allow the horse to move in a circle for training purposes, or for the purpose of a clinical lameness evaluation by a veterinarian.  On certain designs of headgear, a third rein may be added to the paired reins, used for leading, longeing, or other specialized or stylistic purposes.  The best-known example of a third rein used in the USA is the leading rein of the mecate of the classic bosal hackamore.

Types
Types of reins include:

 Closed reins, or loop reins: reins that are either a single piece or that buckle together at the ends. English riders usually use closed reins.  Western riders in timed rodeo events use a single closed rein, as do those who use a romal. A closed rein helps prevent the rider from dropping the reins.
 Double reins: The combined use of two pairs of reins, a curb rein and a snaffle rein. This is usually two single (buckled or sewn) reins, though sometimes split reins may be seen on western-style bridles.  Double reins are used with a double bridle, with bits such as the Pelham bit and, less often, on some gag bits used for polo.
 Draw reins and running reins: long reins, usually made of leather or nylon webbing, that attach to the saddle or the girth, run through the bit rings, and back to the rider.  Several design variations, they add mechanical advantage to the rider's hands and may affect the horse's ability to raise or lower its head.  Often used in conjunction with a snaffle rein by English riders, usually used alone by western riders.
 Lead rein: A third rein used on bridles, not to be confused with the single lead rope of a halter nor the direct rein aid known as the "leading rein".   In North America a third rein is most commonly seen as part of the mecate of a hackamore. In Mongolia it is integral to the bridle, and tied to either a bit ring or a chin strap.
 Long reins, longlines, or driving lines: exceptionally long reins which allow the rider to control the horse from a cart, or from the ground, with the handler walking behind the horse.
 Mecate: a style of rein seen on a bosal style hackamore made of a single piece of rope that encompasses both a closed rein and a leading rope.
 Romal reins: a rein style from the vaquero tradition that incorporates a closed rein with a long quirt at the end.
 Side reins: used when longeing a horse, attached from the bit to the saddle or surcingle, they are not meant to be held by the rider.
 Split reins: a rein style seen in western riding where the reins are not attached to one another at the ends.  They prevent a horse from tangling its feet in a looped rein, particularly when the rider is dismounted. They are considerably longer than closed reins.
 Two reins—reins used on bridles with two reins:
 Snaffle rein: Usually a laced rein that buckles at the center, used on the bradoon of a double bridle, or the upper ring of a pelham bit.
 Curb rein: The rein used at the end of the shank of a curb bit or pelham.  Modern curb reins usually buckle together at the ends, though reins of the classical curb were sewn together at the ends to create a single rein.

In popular expression
In popular culture, to rein in means to hold back, slow down, control or limit.  Sometimes the eggcorn, reign in, is used. Usage of the opposing free rein dates back to Geoffrey Chaucer (1343–1400) and means to give or allow complete freedom, in action and decision, over something.

See also
Horse tack 
Neck rein 
Riding aids

References

External links

Reins

pt:Rédea

The Best Org In The World (Rein Clan) https://m.youtube.com/channel/UCmr2j5VxT1nO4bBiUHyM_6w